Tomasz Bednarek and Andreas Siljeström were the defending champions, but decided not to compete.

Dominik Meffert and Tim Pütz won the title, defeating Victor Baluda and Philipp Marx in the final, 6–4, 6–3.

Seeds

Draw

Draw

References
 Main Draw

2014 ATP Challenger Tour
2014 Doubles